We Are may refer to:

 We Are (Jon Batiste album), 2021
 We Are (The City Harmonic album), 2015
 We Are (Lucy Spraggan album), 2015
 We Are (EP), a 2008 EP by Cassette Kids
 "We Are" (Ana Johnsson song), 2004
 "We Are." (Do As Infinity song), 2000
 "We Are" (Hollywood Undead song)
 "We Are (Family)", a song from the 2012 film Ice Age: Continental Drift
 "0.00 (We Are)", a song from Childish Gambino's 2020 album 3.15.20
 We Are, a 2011 album by Elan Atias
 "We Are", a 2015 song by Justin Bieber featuring Nas from Purpose
 "We Are", a 2017 song by One Ok Rock
 "We Are", a song performed by Hiroshi Kitadani and used for the first opening of One Piece.
 "We Are", a 2013 song by Big Time Rush from 24/Seven

See also